James H. Allen (May 15, 1928 – July 28, 2015) was an American actor who portrayed the clown character Rusty Nails and was the host of various children's television shows in the Portland, Oregon television market from 1957–1972.  His program on  KPTV was the second-longest running children's program in Portland, second only to Ramblin' Rod Anders.

He hosted shows on KOIN, KPTV, and KATU as Rusty Nails. In 1998 he wrote an autobiographical book called "Send in the clowns".

Rusty Nails inspired animator Matt Groening to create Krusty the Clown for The Simpsons.

Allen died on July 28, 2015, of congestive heart failure at the age of 87 after a month of hospice care in Portland.  He was survived by his wife of 60 years, Georgia, four children and nine grandchildren.

See also
List of local children's television series (United States)

References

External links
 
 Rusty's Hour: September 1958 to December 1959
 Rusty Nails and the Three Stooges: January 1960 to March 1962
 The Rusty Nails Cartoon Show: January 1967 to September 1972
 Kids' Comedy Theater: September 1972 to March 1973

1928 births
2015 deaths
American clowns
American children's television presenters
Culture of Portland, Oregon
Local children's television programming in the United States
Male actors from Portland, Oregon
Roosevelt High School (Oregon) alumni